Firuz-Shah Zarrin-Kolah was a Kurdish dignitary, and the seventh in the ancestral line of Shaykh Safi Ardabili, the eponym of the Safavid dynasty of Iran.

Genealogy
In the pre-Safavid written work Safvat as-safa (oldest known extant manuscripts from 1485 and 1491), the origin of the Safavids is traced to Firuz Shah Zarin Kolah who is called a Kurd (from Sanjār), while in the post-Safavid manuscripts, this portion "Kurd from Sanjar" has been excised and Piruz Shah Zarin Kollah is made a descendant of the Shi'ite Imams The male lineage of the Safavid family given by the oldest manuscript of the Safwat al-Safa is:"[Sheykh] Safi al-Din Abul-Fatah Ishaaq the son of Al-Shaykh Amin al-Din Jebrail the son of al-Sâlah Qutb al-Din Abu Bakr the son of Salâh al-Din Rashid the son of Muhammad al-Hafiz al-Kalâm Allah, the son of ‘Avâd the son of Birûz (Pirûz) al-Kurdi al-Sanjāri.

 Firuz Shah likely migrated from Kurdistan to the region of Ardabil in the 11th century.

After the establishment of the Safavids, the genealogy in official texts trace the lineage of Piruz Shah Zarin Kolah to the 7th Shi'ite Imam, Musa al-Kadhim. But the origins of the family of Shaykh Safi al-Din go back not to Hijaz but to Kurdistan, from where, seven generations before him, Firuz Shah Zarin-kulah had migrated to Azerbaijan.

Notes

External links
 Safavid history and Zarrin Kolah in Spanish
  Ebn Bazzaz by R. Savory in Encyclopædia Iranica

Safavid dynasty
Iranian Kurdish people
11th-century Kurdish people